Henry Salt (14 June 178030 October 1827) was an English artist, traveller, collector of antiquities, diplomat, and Egyptologist.

Biography

Early life
Salt, the son of Thomas Salt who was a physician and Alice née Butt, was born in Lichfield on 14 June 1780. He was the youngest of eight children and went to school in Lichfield, Market Bosworth, and then in Birmingham under where his brother John Butt Salt taught. He took an early interest in portrait painting. While in Lichfield, he studied under a watercolour artist, John Glover, and in 1789, he went to London where he first studied under Joseph Farington and later under John Hoppner. After a time, he gave up portrait painting, having failed to build up a reputation.

Early travels
Salt found a position with the English nobleman George Annesley, Viscount Valentia, travelling as his secretary and draughtsman, recommended by Thomas Simon Butt. They started on an eastern tour in June 1802, sailing on the British East India Company's chartered ship Minerva to India via the Cape Colony. Salt explored the Cape of Good Hope, India, and the Red Sea area. Valentia came to describe Salt as a "secretary-draftsman": he was not only a companion, but also sketched the sites and scenes they encountered on their voyage.  In 1805, Valentia sent Salt on a journey into Ethiopia (then often referred to by Europeans by the exonym Abyssinia) to meet with Wolde Selassie, Ras of Tigray to open up trade relations on behalf of the English.  While visiting there, Salt gained the respect of Wolde Selassie. He returned to England on 26 October 1806. His journey home took him through Egypt where he met the Pasha Mehmet Ali. Salt's paintings from the trip were used in Valentia's Voyages and Travels to India, published in 1809. The originals of all the drawings were kept by Valentia, as also the copper plates after Salt's death. The format and style of the plates is similar to Thomas and William Daniell's work, "Oriental Scenery" (1795-1808).

Salt returned to Ethiopia in 1809 on a government mission to develop trade and diplomatic links with the Ethiopian Emperor Egwale Seyon. Upon arrival, he was unable to meet with the king due to unrest in the country, so instead he went to stay with his friend the Ras Wolde Selassie. During this venture, Salt took on the side mission of verifying and correcting the information about the region reported by the Scottish traveler, James Bruce many years earlier. Salt came back to England in 1811 with numerous specimens of both plants and animals. Most notable was a species of dik-dik that was previously unknown to the people of England. He would go on to publish in 1814, A voyage to Abyssinia, and travels into the interior of that country, executed under the orders of the British government in the years 1809 & 1810, whose contents were on the culture, geography, customs, and topography of Ethiopia. He also published a collection of drawings entitled Twenty-four Views Taken in St Helena, The Cape, India, Ceylon, Abyssinia and Egypt. He later returned and continued a friendship with the Ethiopian warlord Sabagadis.

Consul General in Egypt
Through his book and details of exploration, Salt had earned himself a name in the British government and when an opening for the Consul General of Egypt opened up in 1815, Salt was recommended to the position by Lord Valentia and appointed to be the Consul General in Egypt. In 1816, he arrived in Alexandria and traveled to Cairo where he would be stationed as consul. Once set up in Cairo, he began to work on his mission of securing antiquities and artifacts for the British Museum. In order to successfully do this, he believed that he must first be on good terms with the ruler of Egypt, the Pasha Mohamed Ali (aka Mehemet Ali). Salt was able to foster beneficial relations between the British government and Ali acting as a middle man, negotiating deals concerning trade and territorial rights, earning him the affection of Ali. Ali was able to provide Salt with a good residence in the city and a place in his court in return for his help in negotiations. Salt also sponsored the excavations of Thebes and Abu Simbel, personally carrying out significant archaeological research at the pyramids of Giza and the Great Sphinx which earned him praise from Jean-François Champollion for his ability to decipher hieroglyphs. In 1825 Mr. Salt published, at his own expense, Essay on Dr. Young's and M. Champollion's System of Hieroglyphics; with some additional discoveries, by which it may be applied to decipher the names of the ancient kings of Egypt and Ethiopia.

Furthermore, in his tenure as Consul General, Mr. Salt devoted himself to the task of assembling a collection of antiquities, although he was hindered in every possible way by Bernardino Drovetti, who, having been dismissed from his official post, now had the time personally to supervise the search of antiquities around the country. Drovetti had great advantages over his British rival because of his thorough knowledge of Egypt, where he had been living for many years by this time, and also thanks to his close friendship with the Pasha, Muhammad Ali of Egypt. But Salt was not easily discouraged and resorting to the same methods as his rival, he surrounded himself with agents who would not stop for anything. The year he arrived in Cairo he had the good fortune to meet both Giovanni Battista Belzoni, an extraordinary individual who immediately became his main agent, and Giovanni D’Athanasi, a Greek known as Yanni, who worked for him in the Thebes area from 1817 to 1827. Thanks to his assistants, Salt was able to begin selling his artifacts in just two years.

Death 
Henry Salt died at the age of 47 on 30 October 1827 in Desouk in Egypt. He was buried in Alexandria where he was stationed as Consul General. His paintings, papers, and artifacts he collected remain in the possession of the British Museum.

Later, in 1849 Saltia was published, it is a genus of flowering plants from Yemen and Saudi Arabia, belonging to the family Amaranthaceae. It was named in Henry Salt's honour.

Work and contributions to Egyptology

Collections 
His first collection contained artifacts and pieces that Salt acquired from 1816 – 1818. When shipped to England and evaluated by specialists, the total value of the collection was estimated to be approximately £8000, although it would be sold for much less. Records show that the collection ended up being sold in February 1823. The sarcophagus of Seti I, a major piece of the collection was bought by the British architect Sir John Soane for £2000 and the rest was bought by the British Museum for the same price.

Following the assembly of his first collection, Salt began acquiring what would be known as his second collection, containing items he collected from 1819 – 1824. While Salt's primary intention was to sell to the British Museum again, this time for a yearly pension of £600 for his service as the Consul, it would ultimately be rejected due to the price. Despite the British concerns over price, the French royalty wanted to buy the collection and display it at the Louvre, which they did in 1826 for a total of £10,000.

Salt would spend the rest of his life putting together a third collection which featured his antiquities acquired from 1825 to his death in 1827. This collection was sold years after his death when an agent of his sold it to the British Museum for over £7000.

Notable artifacts 

 Head of Ramses II (Young Memnon) 
 Sarcophagus of Seti I
 Head and arm of Thothmes III
 Mummy of Hornedjitef 
 Sarcophagus of Ramesses III 
 Head and supporting Left Arm of Amenhotep III
 Head and upper torso of monumental limestone statue of Amenhotep III wearing nemes.
 Granodiorite seated statue of Amenhotep III.
 Granodiorite statue of Amenhotep III. The statue has been restored.

In popular culture
Salt was portrayed by Robert Portal in the 2005 BBC docudrama Egypt.

Gallery

General references 
Philosophy of Science Portal
An excellent account of Salt and his trials and tribulations collecting antiquities in Egypt is in Maya Jasanoff, Edge of Empire: Conquest and Collecting in the East, 1750-1850, Knopf, 2005

Citations

External links 
 
 

1780 births
1827 deaths
19th-century British archaeologists
British consuls-general in Egypt
English Egyptologists
18th-century English painters
English male painters
19th-century English painters
Fellows of the Royal Society
People from Lichfield
English male non-fiction writers
19th-century English male artists
18th-century English male artists
Abu Simbel